Tomasz Radzinski (born 14 December 1973) is a former professional soccer player who played as a striker and winger. He featured for clubs including North York Rockets in Canada, Germinal Ekeren, Anderlecht (where he won the national championship twice), Lierse and Waasland-Beveren in Belgium, Everton and Fulham in England and Skoda Xanthi in Greece. Born in Poland, he represented Canada at international level having moved there as a teenager, receiving 46 full caps between 1995 and 2009.

Club career
Prior to his moving to Canada, Radziński began his playing career as a youth with Cuiavia Inowrocław in his native Poland, and Germany's VfL Osnabrück. He joined the North York Rockets of the Canadian Soccer League in 1990 and remained with the club through the league's demise in 1992 to the club's last year, played in the National Soccer League (NSL), in 1993. He played in the summer of 1994 with the St. Catharines Wolves (of the same league which however was by then renamed to the Canadian National Soccer League).

Radziński returned to Europe, joining Germinal Ekeren in Belgium in 1994. From there he eventually signed for Belgian giants Anderlecht for whom he scored 57 goals in 90 appearances – including five UEFA Champions League strikes in his last season with the Belgian champions – before moving to Everton for around £4.5 million, the highest transfer fee paid for a Canadian up to that time.

At Everton, Radziński scored 25 times in 91 Premiership outings before requesting a transfer, eventually securing a three-year deal with Fulham F.C. worth £1.75 million. Radzinski wasn't as prolific at Fulham as he was in his previous side, but won over the fans with several crucial goals. Radzinski was released at the end of the 2006–07 season by new manager Lawrie Sanchez, totalling 17 goals in 117 appearances.

On 28 August 2007, he signed for Greek team Skoda Xanthi, on a free transfer.

One year later, on 30 August 2008, he signed a one-year contract for Belgian Second Division club Lierse, although his previous contract was valid until 2010. Lierse first had their eye on Peter Utaka, but when he transferred to Odense, they elected to sign Radzinski. Radzinski had disclosed to the press his belief that members of Skoda Xanthi had been involved in match fixing and was seeking a transfer.

On 29 January 2012, Belgian Second Division side Waasland-Beveren announced they had signed Radzinski on a short-term deal until the end of the 2011–12 season with an option for an additional year.

International career
Radzinski made his debut for the Canadian national team in a June 1995 friendly match against Turkey. He earned a total of 46 caps, scoring 10 goals making him tied 9th with Paul Peschisolido in all-time scoring for Canada.

In October 1999, Radzinski had been called up to the Canada national team by coach Holger Osieck, he promised to attend, failed to turn up and later refused to be interviewed about it. The Canadian Soccer Association approached FIFA to have Radzinski prevented from playing for Anderlecht as a result. Kevan Pipe, the head of the CSA called Radzinski's actions "an insult to his teammates, his coach and the country". In October 2001, he announced that he'd like to play for Canada again as they had a friendly against European opponents, Malta. He has represented Canada in 19 FIFA World Cup qualification matches. in three FIFA World Cup qualification campaigns (1998, 2006 and 2010)

He also holds a Belgian passport through his marriage.

Post-playing career
Radzinski was the technical director of Belgian football club Lierse S.K. from 2013 to 2015.

Career statistics

International
Source:

International goals
Scores and results list Canada's goal tally first.

Honours

Club
Germinal Ekeren
 Belgian Cup: 1996–97

Anderlecht
Belgian First Division: 1999–2000, 2000–01
Belgian Super Cup: 2000

Lierse
 Belgian Second Division: 2009–10

Individual
 Belgian First Division Top Scorers: 2000–01

References

External links

 / Canada Soccer Hall of Fame
ESPN Soccernet profile

1973 births
Living people
Footballers from Poznań
Naturalized citizens of Canada
Naturalised citizens of Belgium
Belgian people of Canadian descent
Belgian people of Polish descent
Association football forwards
Soccer people from Ontario
Canadian soccer players
Canada men's under-23 international soccer players
Canada men's international soccer players
Polish footballers
Belgian footballers
North York Rockets players
St. Catharines Roma Wolves players
Beerschot A.C. players
R.S.C. Anderlecht players
Everton F.C. players
Fulham F.C. players
Xanthi F.C. players
Lierse S.K. players
S.K. Beveren players
Canadian Soccer League (1987–1992) players
Belgian Pro League players
Challenger Pro League players
Premier League players
Super League Greece players
Canadian expatriate soccer players
Canadian expatriate sportspeople in Greece
Polish emigrants to Canada
Polish expatriate footballers
Polish expatriate sportspeople in Belgium
Polish expatriate sportspeople in England
Polish expatriate sportspeople in Greece
Belgian expatriate footballers
Expatriate footballers in Belgium
Expatriate footballers in England
Expatriate footballers in Greece
1996 CONCACAF Gold Cup players
Canadian National Soccer League players
Canadian expatriate sportspeople in England